Benicarló is a city and municipality in the north of the province of Castelló, part of the Valencian Community, in the Mediterranean Coast between the cities of Vinaròs and Peníscola, not too far south from the Ebre River.

Tourism, agriculture and some manufacturing are the major industries. Benicarló is part of the Taula del Sénia free association of municipalities.

Benicarló is served by a train station in the Valencia-Barcelona line, and is connected by road through the A7 Highway.

Main sights
Chapel of Cristo del Mar
Parish church of Sant Bartolomeu (18th century). It has a Baroque façade, an octagonal bell tower and a dome over the transept. The interior, on a single nave, houses an altarpiece attributed to Vicente Juan Masip.
Convent of St. Francis (1578)
Hermitage of St. Gregory, located c. 2 km outside the city.

Twin towns
 Ladispoli, Italy

References

External links
 

Municipalities in the Province of Castellón
Maestrazgo